Lower Manhattan Coastal Resiliency (LMCR) refers to a range of climate change adaptation strategies of coastal management to address impacts on the city in the wake of the extensive Hurricane Sandy flooding of 2012.

A more localized alternative to the New York Harbor Storm-Surge Barrier, it has some continuity with the centuries-long Lower Manhattan expansion trend and seeks to compensate for the historical loss of wetland buffer zones, and would be integrated into the Manhattan Waterfront Greenway.

History
After Sandy, Governor Andrew Cuomo and Mayor Michael Bloomberg differed on their preferred infrastructure responses, with Cuomo favoring a storm barrier to protect the entire estuary, and Bloomberg localized protection for Lower Manhattan inspired by Battery Park City. Several studies have been commissioned since, including the BIG U from Bjarke Ingels Group for a semi-circle of berms that would allow small-scale controlled floods, in contrast with the more ambitious seawall proposals.  Their 2014 plan largely involved constructing a series of berms in Lower Manhattan, inland from the shoreline. but has been deemed inadequate in parts and too costly to maintain.

Bloomberg's 2013 concept of "Seaport City" has been replaced by the FiDi-Seaport plan, as part of the wider LMCR initiative by the De Blasio administration.  It updates the BIG U with more substantial land reclamation that could be funded and finished, avoiding the occasional temporary flooding of the earlier plan and its maintenance costs.  Initial plans focus on landfilling and building up East River Park.

References

Climate change adaptation
Environmental issues in New York City
Government of New York City
Hurricane Sandy
Lower Manhattan
Proposed buildings and structures in New York City
Climate change policy in the United States